Daplasa is a genus of moths in the subfamily Lymantriinae of the family Erebidae erected by Frederic Moore in 1879. It is the sole member of the tribe Daplasini erected Jeremy Daniel Holloway and Houshuai Wang in 2015.

Species
Daplasa albolyclene Holloway, 1999 Borneo
Daplasa blacklinea Chao, 1985 China (Guangdong, Sichuan, Hainan)
Daplasa irrorata Moore, 1879 Tibet, Darjeeling, Bengal, China (Fujian, Jiangxi, Hubei, Hunan, Guangdong, Guangxi, Hainan, Sichuan, Yunnan)
Daplasa lyclene (Swinhoe, 1904) Borneo, ?Sumatra
Daplasa melanoma (Collenette, 1938) N.Yunnan, Sichuan
Daplasa nivisala Pang, Rindos, Kishida & Wang, 2019 China (Yunnan)
Daplasa postincisa (Moore, 1879) Bengal
Daplasa variegata (Moore, 1879) Darjeeling, Nepal

References

Moore, F. (1879). in Hewitson & Moore. Descriptions of New Indian Lepidopterous Insects from the Collection of the Late Mr. W.S. Atkinson. (1): 51.

Lymantriinae
Moth tribes